The Cinema Audio Society Award for Outstanding Achievement in Sound Mixing for a Motion Picture – Live Action is an annual award given by the Cinema Audio Society to live action motion picture sound mixer for their outstanding achievements in sound mixing. The award came to its current title in 2013, when feature motion pictures were separated into two categories; achievement in live action sound mixing, and achievement in animated sound mixing (later, documentary features would get their own category as well). Before this, the category was labeled Outstanding Achievement in Sound Mixing for Motion Pictures, and was given annually starting in 1994 (for films released the previous year).

Winners and nominees

1990s
Outstanding Achievement in Sound Mixing for Motion Pictures

2000s

2010s

Outstanding Achievement in Sound Mixing for a Motion Picture – Live Action

2020s

See also
 Academy Award for Best Sound
 BAFTA Award for Best Sound

References

External links
 Cinema Audio Society Official website

Outstanding Achievement in Sound Mixing for a Motion Picture – Live Action
Awards established in 1993